The Botswana national under-16 basketball team is a national basketball team of Botswana, administered by the Botswana Basketball Association (BBA).

It represents the country in international under-16 (under age 16) basketball competitions.

It appeared at the 2015 FIBA Africa Under-16 Championship qualifying round.

See also
Botswana men's national basketball team
Botswana men's national under-18 basketball team
Botswana women's national under-16 basketball team

References

External links
Botswana Basketball Records at FIBA Archive

U-17
Men's national under-16 basketball teams